JetBlue Flight 191 was a scheduled domestic commercial passenger flight from New York to Las Vegas, United States. On March 27, 2012, the Airbus A320 serving the route diverted to Rick Husband Amarillo International Airport, in Amarillo, Texas, after the captain, suffering from an apparent mental breakdown, started behaving erratically and making disturbing and incoherent statements, leading to the first officer tricking him into entering the cabin where he was restrained by passengers. There were no fatalities.

Incident
Captain Clayton Osbon (49), was locked out of the cockpit by First Officer Jason Dowd (41), and was subdued by passengers after he started acting erratically and ranting about terrorists and 9/11 and apparently suffered from an unspecified mental breakdown. The aircraft was then diverted to Amarillo. Osbon received medical treatment by Northwest Texas Healthcare System.

Dowd grew concerned when Osbon made comments such as "We need to take a leap of faith", "We're not going to Vegas", and "I can't be held responsible when this plane crashes." Osbon began giving what the first officer described as a sermon. Dowd tricked Osbon into going to the passenger compartment, then locked the cockpit door and changed the security code. Osbon railed at passengers about Jesus, Al-Qaeda, countries in the Middle East, and a possible bomb on board. Alarmed passengers tackled him and tied him up with seat belt extenders. An off-duty JetBlue pilot who was travelling as a passenger joined Dowd in the cockpit and the plane landed about 20 minutes later in Amarillo. Osbon was arrested and charged with "interference with a flight crew."

The 49-year-old Osbon was suspended from work after being with JetBlue for 12 years. He had attended Carnegie Mellon University and graduated in 1987 from Nathaniel Hawthorne College, an aeronautics and aviation college located in New Hampshire.

Trial and lawsuits 
On Tuesday, July 3, 2012, Osbon was found not guilty by reason of insanity of the charge of interference with the flight crew by an Amarillo, Texas-based federal judge, Judge Mary Lou Robinson. Mr. Osbon was then ordered to be held pending a further investigation; he was then immediately transferred to a mental health facility in Fort Worth for additional treatment.

After Captain Osbon was evaluated in a federal mental health facility in North Carolina, on November 9, 2012, US District Judge Robinson freed him under the provisions that he continue mental health treatment, follow a prescribed medication regime, and meet a variety of other conditions. Osbon must continue to be monitored by his probation officer for an undetermined amount of time. "This is a bad situation for you and your family, but you are very fortunate to have the type of immediate support you have," Robinson said. "Good Luck, Mr. Osbon."

In March 2015, Mr. Osbon filed a suit against JetBlue for $14.9 million, claiming that the airline did not ensure he was fit to fly, and endangered the lives of the crew and the passengers. The suit was filed three days after the Germanwings Flight 9525 crash, in which the co-pilot deliberately crashed the plane killing all the people aboard. The passenger suit was settled the following month; terms of the settlement were not disclosed to the public.

Causes of illness 
The cause of Osbon's mental breakdown remains unknown. Possibilities suggested included the onset of a psychotic disorder, a neurological event that compromised his brain function, or intoxication due to medication. In his March 2015 lawsuit against JetBlue, Osbon claimed the incident was caused by a complex partial brain seizure.

See also
List of air rage incidents

References

Aviation accidents and incidents in the United States in 2012
Accidents and incidents involving the Airbus A320
Airliner accidents and incidents in Texas
2012 in Texas
191
March 2012 events in the United States
Airliner accidents and incidents caused by pilot incapacitation